Anatoma maxima is a species of minute sea snail, a marine gastropod mollusk or micromollusk in the family Anatomidae.

The generic position is uncertain: Anatoma or Thieleella (protoconch sculpture unknown)

Description
The size of the shell varies between 2 mm and 3 mm.

Distribution
This marine species occurs off Indonesia and the Philippines.

References

 Geiger, D.L. (2012). Monograph of the little slit shells. Volume 1. Introduction, Scissurellidae. pp. 1-728. Volume 2. Anatomidae, Larocheidae, Depressizonidae, Sutilizonidae, Temnocinclidae. pp. 729–1291. Santa Barbara Museum of Natural History Monographs. Number 7

External links
 To Encyclopedia of Life
 To World Register of Marine Species
 

Anatomidae
Gastropods described in 1908